Bundu subdivision is an administrative subdivision in the Ranchi district of the South Chotanagpur division in the state of Jharkhand, India.

Overview
Ranchi district is a part of the Ranchi plateau, most of it at an average elevation of 2,140 feet above sea level. Only a small portion in the north-eastern part of the district is the lower Ranchi plateau, spread over Silli, Rahe, Sonahatu and Tamar CD blocks, at an elevation of 500 to 1,000 feet above sea level. There is a 16 km long ridge south-west of Ranchi. There are isolated hills in the central plateau.

Administrative divisions

Ranchi district is divided into two sub-divisions:Ranchi Sadar subdivision and Bundu subdivision. Ranchi Sadar subdivision consists of 14 CD blocks: Kanke, Ratu, Chanho, Mandar, Lapung, Burmu, Bero, Namkum, Ormanjhi, Angara, Silli, Khelari, Nagri and Itki. Bundu subdivision consists of 4 CD blocks: Rahe, Bundu, Sonahatu and Tamar. The details of the CD blocks are given below for the respective subdivision.

There are two statutory towns in the district - Ranchi is a municipal corporation housing the headquarters of Ranchi Sadar subdivision, and Bundu is a nagar panchayat, housing the headquarters of Bundu subdivision. There are thirteen census towns in Ranchi district, all are in Ranchi Sadar subdivision: Bisrampur, Churi, Ray, Khelari, Kanke, Arsande, Ibra, Muri, Tati, Ara, Bargarwa, Ratu and Tundul.

Police stations
The following police stations are located in the Bundu subdivision: Bundu, Sonahatu, Tamar and Mahila Bundu. There is a police outpost at Rahe,

Blocks
Community development blocks in the Bundu subdivision are:

References

Sub-divisions in Jharkhand